{{DISPLAYTITLE:Tau8 Serpentis}}

Tau8 Serpentis, Latinized from τ8 Serpentis, is an A-type main sequence star in the constellation of Serpens, approximately 320 light-years from the Earth. It has an apparent visual magnitude of approximately 6.144.  Although it was observed to be binary by speckle interferometry in 1985, subsequent observations show no sign of binarity, and the detection appears to have been spurious.

References

A-type main-sequence stars
Double stars
Serpens (constellation)
Serpentis, Tau8
BD+17 2906
Serpentis, 26
140729
077111
5858